Polish regions are regions that are in present-day Poland but are not identified in its administrative division.

Geophysical regions
(Transborder regions = *)

Northern & Western Poland
 Central European Plain* (Nizina Środkowoeuropejska)
 Silesia*
 Pomerania*

Southern Poland
 Bohemian Massif* (Masyw Czeski)
  (Wyżyny Polskie)
 Sandomierz Basin (Kotlina Sandomierska)
 Subcarpathia*
 * (Podkarpacie Zachodnie)
  (Podkarpacie Północne) and
 * (Podkarpacie Wschodnie)
 Carpathian Mountains* 
 Western Carpathians* (Karpaty Zachodnie) and 
 Eastern Carpathians* (Karpaty Wschodnie)

Eastern Poland
 * (Wyżyny Ukraińskie)
 * (Niż Wschodniobałtycko-Białoruski)

Historical regions of the current Polish state

Masuria/Warmia 
Mazovia 
Podlachia 
Kuyavia 
Łęczyca 
Wielkopolska (Greater Poland) 
Małopolska (Lesser Poland) 
Sandomierz 
Kashubia/Pomerelia 
Lubusz 
Other regions: 
Polesia 
Lusatia 
Pomerania
Ruthenia/Galicia
Silesia

See also
Administrative divisions of Poland
Historical regions of Central Europe
Territorial changes of Poland
Voivodeships of Poland

References